Listen Up is an American sitcom television series created by Jeff Martin, that aired on CBS from September 20, 2004, until April 25, 2005. The sitcom was based loosely on the life and exploits of the popular sportswriter and sports-media personality Tony Kornheiser. Its principal executive producer was Jason Alexander, who was also the lead actor. Despite decent-to-good ratings, the show was canceled by CBS on May 18, 2005; "rising production costs" was the major reason officially given for the cancellation.

Premise
Tony Kleinman is a sports show host whose sidekick is Bernie Widmer, a former NFL player; together they host the TV show Listen Up. While Tony does talk about sports on the show and in his newspaper column, he strays away occasionally to talk about the daily exploits of his family: his wife, Dana, a fund-raiser coordinator; his son, Mickey, a 15-year-old golf prodigy, and Megan, his 14-year-old, know-it-all, smart-mouthed, soccer-playing daughter.

Cast
 Jason Alexander as Tony Kleinman
 Wendy Makkena as Dana Kleinman
 Daniella Monet as Megan Kleinman
 Will Rothhaar as Mickey Kleinman
 Malcolm-Jamal Warner as Bernie Widmer

Episodes

Reception

Critical response
Critical reaction was largely negative. USA Today's Robert Bianco wrote that the show makes the "mistake of trying to build a star vehicle around a second banana". A New York Times review called it "a rickety vehicle for Jason Alexander". Critics disagreed on the supporting cast – while USA Today noted, "When 'Listen Up' focuses on its supporting cast, the show works", The New York Times referred to a "stiff supporting cast". Matt Rouse of TV Guide wrote, "Forget about the 'Seinfeld' curse, this is just mediocre material and bad casting."

Ratings
The premiere episode drew 11.8 million viewers, while the final episode drew 8.9 million viewers.

External links

References

2000s American sitcoms
2004 American television series debuts
2005 American television series endings
CBS original programming
English-language television shows
Television series about television
Television series by CBS Studios
Television series by 20th Century Fox Television
Television series about radio